Light Up the Bomb the fourth studio album by American rapper 8Ball. The album was released on October 10, 2006, by 8 Ways Entertainment & Koch Records.

Track listing

Charts

References

8Ball & MJG albums
2006 albums